Lac des Sapins, literally translated into English as 'the lake of the fir-trees', is an artificial lake located in the region of Rhône-Alpes.  It is situated 65 km northwest of the city of Lyon.

History 
Construction of the lake began in the summer of 1967 by Louis Gueydon.  The lake was built to try to develop the tourist industry in the region after a decline in industry in rural areas.  In 1983, a camping park next to the lake was built with chalets, caravans etc.  The investment proved to be successful, and in 1990 the camping park was extended, with the chalets and caravans upgraded or renovated.  There were also multiple sports activities proposed (mountain biking, wind-surfing, volleyball and acrobranching).

External links 
 Lac des Sapins

Landforms of Rhône (department)
Sapins
Sapins
Tourist attractions in Rhône (department)